Sion railway station is a railway station in the municipality of Sion, in the Swiss canton of Valais. It is an intermediate stop on the Simplon line and is served by local and long-distance trains.

Services 
The following services stop at Sion:

PRODES EA 2035 
As part of the strategic development program for rail infrastructure (PRODES), the Confederation and SBB are focusing on customer orientation and economical management of resources.

By 2040, nearly two million people will travel by rail every day, 50% more than today. In rail freight, the Confederation also expects traffic to increase by around 45%. The Swiss rail network will have to continue to meet customer needs: interesting connections, punctual trains, affordable tickets. SBB is committed to the sustainable development of public transport and takes on this responsibility vis-à-vis Switzerland.

Predicted service 

 EuroCity:
 Eight trains per day between Geneva Cornavin and Milano Centrale, with two trains continuing to Venezia Santa Lucia.
 InterCity:
 Half-hourly service between Brig and Geneva Airport.
 RegionAlps:
 : Half-hourly service between St-Gingolph and Brig

References

External links 
 
 
 

Railway stations in the canton of Valais
Swiss Federal Railways stations